Fragile X mental retardation syndrome-related protein 1 is a protein that in humans is encoded by the FXR1 gene.

The protein encoded by this gene is an RNA binding protein that interacts with the functionally similar proteins FMR1 and FXR2. These proteins shuttle between the nucleus and cytoplasm and associate with polyribosomes, predominantly with the 60S ribosomal subunit. Three transcript variants encoding different isoforms have been found for this gene.

Interactions
FXR1 has been shown to interact with FXR2, FMR1 and CYFIP2.

References

Further reading